Clara Wildschut  (11 June 1906 – 27 August 1950) was a Dutch composer, pianist and violinist born in Deventer. She studied music at the Royal Conservatory of the Hague with Johan Wagenaar, E. van Beinum, André Spoor and F. Broer van Dijk. In 1930, she won a state scholarship for composition. She studied composition with Joseph Marx in Vienna and returned to Amsterdam in 1937.

Works
Her compositions include:

Chamber 
Serenade (woodwind quintet)
Sonata (violin and piano)
Sonatina (violin and piano)
String Quartet
Two Sonatines (oboe and piano; one arranged for oboe and orchestra)

Orchestra 
Entrata Capricciosa
Fuga en Romance (string orchestra)

Piano 
Theme with Twelve Variations and Fugue

Vocal 
over 70 songs (voice and piano)
some a capella music for choir

References 

1906 births
1950 deaths
Dutch women composers